Juan Carlos Aguilar and Felipe Meligeni Alves were the defending champions, but both players were ineligible to participate.

Hsu Yu-hsiou and Wu Yibing won the title, defeating Toru Horie and Yuta Shimizu in the final, 6–4, 5–7, [11–9].

Seeds

Draw

Finals

Top half

Bottom half

External links 
 Main draw

Boys' Doubles
US Open, 2017 Boys' Doubles